La Farge Land Office, also known as Orleans Hotel, is a historic commercial building located at Orleans in Jefferson County, New York. It was built about 1825 and is a 2-story, five-by-three-bay, side-gabled limestone building in the Federal style.  A -story stone wing extends from the rear of the house and a 1-story wooden addition was completed in 1910.  It was built by land speculator and French merchant  John La Farge, as a land office, residence, and hotel.  He used it until he returned to New York City in 1838.

It was listed on the National Register of Historic Places in 1996.

References

Office buildings on the National Register of Historic Places in New York (state)
Federal architecture in New York (state)
Commercial buildings completed in 1825
Buildings and structures in Jefferson County, New York
National Register of Historic Places in Jefferson County, New York